Emma Clark or Clarke may refer to:

People
Emma Chichester Clark (born 1955), British children's book illustrator and author
Emma Clarke (born 1971), writer and voice-over artist
Emma Clarke (field hockey) in 2007 Women's EuroHockey Nations Championship squads
Emma Clarke (footballer) (1876–?), British footballer
Emma Clark (garden designer) (fl. 1990s–2000s), British designer of Islamic gardens

Fictional characters
Emma Clark, character in 7 Women
Emma Clark, character in Hell's House